The Treasurer/Insurance Commissioner/Fire Marshal (commonly referred to as State Treasurer) is a former statewide constitutional officer of Florida.  The office was abolished following the Florida Cabinet reforms of 1998 which took effect in 2003.

A statewide office, with a seat in the Cabinet, the official handled the duties of the State Treasurer, Commissioner of Insurance, and Fire Marshal.  These duties included payroll, pensions, tax collection, state finances, insurance regulation, and the investigation of fires.  The most visible responsibility of the officeholder was as Insurance Commissioner.

Following the Cabinet reform, the office was merged with that of the state Comptroller to create the new office of Chief Financial Officer of Florida, which oversees the Florida Department of Financial Services.  The new department contains many of the functions of the previous offices, but has less direct control over insurance regulation than the previous office did.  This was done to lessen the control of one person over financial services regulation in the state.

Tom Gallagher was the last Treasurer/Insurance Commissioner/Fire Marshal and the first CFO. Other persons who held the office included U.S. Senator Bill Nelson and William D. Gunter, Jr.

Officeholders

Territorial Era (1821-1845)

Charles H Austin, Sr. - 1833 - 1835  (died 1837)

Thomas Hall Austin - ? 1838 - 1840 - ?

Henry Livingston Rutgers  - 4-Feb-1843-Statehood  (see Senate Journal of 4-Feb-1843)

References